Ian James Adamos (born 3 April 1988) is a professional footballer who plays as a midfielder. Born in San Diego, California, he represented Guam at international level.

Club career
Adamos attended the Morse High School in San Diego, California and played for the Tigers soccer team. In 2006, he attended from the High School and started his soccer career with San Diego Flash. He then joined FIlipino side Global FC in January 2012, before signed in summer for American side SoCal Elite.

International career 
Adamos made his first appearance for the Guam national team in 2012.

References

1988 births
Living people
Guamanian footballers
American soccer players
Soccer players from San Diego
Guam international footballers
Association football midfielders
San Diego Flash players
Global Makati F.C. players
American expatriate sportspeople in the Philippines
Expatriate footballers in the Philippines